Steven E. Foster is a former major general in the United States Air National Guard and mobilization assistant to the commander of North American Aerospace Defense Command. Previously assignments include commander of the 115th Fighter Wing of the Wisconsin Air National Guard. He has acquired more than 3,800 hours flying in a Cessna T-37 Tweet, Northrop T-38 Talon, Cessna O-2 Skymaster, Fairchild Republic A-10 Thunderbolt II, and General Dynamics F-16 Fighting Falcon. As a civilian he pilots a McDonnell Douglas MD-11 for FedEx Express.

Awards he has received include the Legion of Merit, the Meritorious Service Medal, the Air Medal, the Aerial Achievement Medal, the Air Force Commendation Medal, the Army Commendation Medal, the Air Force Outstanding Unit Award with valor device, the Air Force Organizational Excellence Award, the Combat Readiness Medal with silver oak leaf cluster and four bronze oak leaf clusters, the National Defense Service Medal, the Armed Forces Expeditionary Medal, the Global War on Terrorism Service Medal, the Air Force Overseas Ribbon, the Air Force Longevity Service Award with silver oak leaf cluster, the Armed Forces Reserve Medal with hourglass device, the Small Arms Expert Marksmanship Ribbon with service star, the Air Force Training Ribbon.

In 2010, Foster was Air National Guard Assistant to the Commander, Air Forces Central, Shaw Air Force Base, South Carolina.

Education
1977 Bachelor of Science degree, United States Air Force Academy
1978 Undergraduate Pilot Training
1983 Squadron Officer School
1986 Master of Business Administration degree, Webster University, St. Louis, Missouri
1999 Air War College, by correspondence

References

Military personnel from Wisconsin
United States Air Force generals
Recipients of the Legion of Merit
Recipients of the Air Medal
United States Air Force Academy alumni
Webster University alumni
Living people
Year of birth missing (living people)